Venera Zinurovna Zaripova (born 5 April 1966 in Tashkömür, Kyrgyz SSR, USSR) is a former individual Soviet rhythmic gymnast. She is a two-time all-around silver medalist and 4-time gold medalist in the USSR Championships.

Career 
Venera was the 5th and last child of a Tatar family. Her mother was a housewife, her father worked as a miner. Soon after, the family moved to Uchkuduk, Uzbekistan. At 5 years old Zaripova started ballet, then began gymnastics. Her first coach in rhythmic gymnastics was Olga Tulubaeva. To pursue gymnastics, Venera had to drop out of the music school.

At 9 years of age, she met with then head coach of Uzbek rhythmic gymnastics Irina Viner, Zaripova would soon be under Viner's tutelage and would become her first successful rhythmic gymnastics student. In 1978, Venera relocated to Tashkent and began training with the sport under Viner's class.

At age 14, she became a member the USSR team. Venera won the all-around silver at the 1981 USSR Championships beating Irina Deriugina who took the bronze medal. She won another all-around silver at the 1983 USSR Championships behind Dalia Kutkaitė. Zaripova made the Soviet team with (Galina Beloglazova and Dalia Kutkaitė) who competed at the 1983 World Championships, Zaripova finished 13th in all-around after a drop out of carpet from her hoop, she qualified to 2 apparatus finals finishing 4th in ribbon and 7th in clubs. In 1984, Zaripova began to struggle with injury, she competed in her last USSR Championships in 1986 and won the gold in hoop.

In 1988, during the end of her gymnastics career, Venera graduated from Tashkent State Institute of Law. In 1990, she was invited to coach in rhythmic gymnastics in Israel. In 1993, she married an Israeli businessman David Levy, they have a daughter named Irina and two sons. She now resides in Eilat, Israel and annual international rhythmic gymnastics competition is held called the "Venera Cup". She still occasionally performs in galas in international meet invitations and in Moscow, Russia.

References

External links
- Venera welcome
Rhythmic Gymnastics Results

1966 births
Living people
People from Jalal-Abad Region
Tatar sportspeople
Uzbekistani rhythmic gymnasts
Soviet rhythmic gymnasts
Uzbekistani people of Tatar descent
Uzbekistani emigrants to Israel